Morrill County is a county in the U.S. state of Nebraska. As of the 2010 United States Census, the population was 5,042. Its county seat is Bridgeport.

In the Nebraska license plate system, Morrill County is represented by the prefix 64 (it had the 64th-largest number of vehicles registered in the state when the license plate system was established in 1922).

History
The Battle of Mud Springs and the Battle of Rush Creek between the US Army and Cheyenne, Lakota Sioux, and Arapaho occurred in 1865 within what would become Morrill County.

On 3 November 1908, voters in Cheyenne County passed a measure calling for the division of that county. Accordingly, the Nebraska State Legislature passed an act providing for the division of Cheyenne County, the line of division running east–west, south of the town of Bridgeport. The northern portion so divided was to be called Morrill County. In December of that year, another election determined Bridgeport to be the seat of the new county, and the new county's officials were determined. The county was named for Charles Henry Morrill, a president of the Lincoln Land Company.

Geography
The terrain of Morrill County consists of low rolling hills. A portion of the area is used for agriculture, including some center pivot irrigation. The North Platte River flows east-southeastward through the south-central part of the county, passing Bridgeport before exiting the county some 4 mi (6 km) above the southeast county corner.

The rock was a prominent landmark on the Oregon Trail, and has become a symbol of Nebraska, appearing on the state's license plates and on its commemorative quarter.

Adjacent counties

 Box Butte County – north
 Sheridan County – northeast
 Garden County – east
 Cheyenne County – south
 Banner County – southwest
 Scotts Bluff County – northwest

Main highways

  - runs north and south through the county
  – runs northwest–southeast along the north side of the North Platte River
   Nebraska Highway 92– runs southeast from the western border to its intersection with US 26 near Broadwater
  Nebraska Highway 88 - runs east from a point north of the southwest corner of the county; turns north to its intersection with US 385 in Bridgeport

Demographics

As of the 2000 United States Census,  5,440 people, 2,138 households, and 1,494 families resided in the county. The population density was 4 people per square mile (1/km2).  The2,460 housing units averaged 2 per square mile (1/km2). The racial makeup of the county was 93.68% White, 0.07% African American, 0.72% Native American, 0.22% Asian, 4.12% from other races, and 1.19% from two or more races. About 10.09% of the population was Hispanic or Latino of any race. The people were about 40.5% were of 40.5% German, 9.2% English, 7.3% Irish, and 6.7% American ancestry.

Of the 2,138 households, 32.10% had children under the age of 18 living with them, 59.50% were married couples living together, 6.50% had a female householder with no husband present, and 30.10% were not families. About 26.90% of all households were made up of individuals, and 13.00% had someone living alone who was 65 years of age or older. The average household size was 2.49 and the average family size was 3.03.

The county population was distributed as  27.20% under the age of 18, 7.20% from 18 to 24, 24.40% from 25 to 44, 24.20% from 45 to 64, and 17.00% who were 65 years of age or older. The median age was 40 years. For every 100 females, there were 97.90 males. For every 100 females age 18 and over, there were 95.60 males.

The median income for a household in the county was $30,235, and for a family was $36,673. Males had a median income of $27,107 versus $19,271 for females. The per capita income for the county was $14,725. About 10.00% of families and 14.70% of the population were below the poverty line, including 20.00% of those under age 18 and 10.30% of those age 65 or over.

Communities

Cities 

 Bayard
 Bridgeport

Village 

 Broadwater

Unincorporated communities 

 Angora
 Atkins
 Bonner
 Lynn
 Moomaw Corner
 Northport
 Redington
 Vance

Former Communities

 Alden
 Chimney Rock
 Finley
 Goodstreak
 Hickory
 Kelly
 Kuhn
 Riley
 Simla

Law enforcement
 
In 2008 the sheriff's office employed four officers and five civilians.

The Humane Society of the United States awarded Sheriff Johyn D. Edens the 2009 Humane Law Enforcement Award for his investigation of mistreatment of 200 mustangs on an animal sanctuary. The owner of the Three Strikes Ranch, Jason Meduna, was sentenced to two consecutive 20-60 month terms, by Judge Leo Dobrovolny at the Morrill County Courthouse.

In the 13 May 2010 Republican primary, Milo Cardenas and Travis Petersen, polled 379 votes each (there being no Democratic candidate), and the decision was due to be made between then by a game of chance such as a coin flip, subject only to a recount. After two recounts, Morrill County Clerk, Kathy Brandt offered the candidates the choice to "either cut a card or have their names pulled out of a hat", cards were selected and the election board shuffled the deck seven times before spreading the cards on the table for a simultaneous draw. Brandt said "Cardenas and Petersen both drew at the same time. Milo, drew a nine of hearts and Petersen drew a six of spades." Thus Cardenas went forward to the final ballot, scheduled for November 2010, with no other registered candidates.

Politics and government
Morrill County is in Nebraska's Nebraska's 3rd congressional district. As of 2017, it was represented in the US House of Representatives by Adrian Smith, a member of the Republican Party. As of 2017, the county was part of the state's 47th legislative district, and was represented in the Nebraska Legislature by Steve Erdman; Erdman is a member of the Republican Party, though the legislature is officially nonpartisan.

As of late 2016, 3314 registered voters were in Morrill County. Of these, 2175, or 65.6%, were Republicans; 591, or 17.8%, were Democrats; 522, or 15.8%, registered no political party; and 26, or 0.8%, were Libertarians.

Morrill County voters are reliably Republican in national politics. In no national election since 1936 has the county selected the Democratic Party candidate (as of 2020).

See also
 National Register of Historic Places listings in Morrill County NE
 Morrill County Sheriff's Office (Nebraska)

References

 
Nebraska counties
Populated places established in 1908
1908 establishments in Nebraska